Shravya is an Indian actress who has appeared in Telugu and Tamil language films. After making her debut as a child actress, Shravya has since played lead roles in Love You Bangaram (2014) and Vellikizhamai 13am Thethi (2016).

Career
Shravya began her career as a child artist in the Telugu film industry, featuring in projects including Sandade Sandadi (2002) and Arya (2004). In 2014, she made her debut as a leading actress with Govi's Love You Bangaram and then also worked on Kai Raja Kai (2015). The films both received mixed reviews from critics.

In 2016, Shravya made her debut in Tamil language films through a role in Pugazh Mani's Vellikizhamai 13am Thethi (2016). Featuring alongside Rathan Mouli and Suza Kumar, the film garnered mixed reviews and had a low profile release at the box office.

Filmography

References

Indian film actresses
Tamil actresses
Living people
Actresses in Tamil cinema
Actresses from Hyderabad, India
Actresses in Telugu cinema
Year of birth missing (living people)
21st-century Indian actresses